Sir John Wynn, 1st Baronet (1553 – 1 March 1627), was a Welsh baronet, Member of Parliament and antiquary.

Life
He was the son of Morys Wynn ap John, whom he succeeded in 1580, inheriting Gwydir Castle in Carnarvonshire. John was educated at All Souls College, Oxford (1570, awarded BA 1578) and studied law at Furnival's Inn (1572) and the Inner Temple (1576). He claimed to be directly descended from the princes of Gwynedd through Rhodri ab Owain son of Owain Gwynedd. The male line from his family died out in 1779 (see 'Legacy' section below) and the senior male line passed to the Anwyl of Tywyn family.  His mother was Jane (Siân) Bulkeley, daughter of Sir Richard Bulkeley and his wife Catherine Griffith, and sister of Sir Richard Bulkeley, head of the Anglesey branch of a powerful landowning family, who originally came from Cheshire.

He was Member of Parliament for this county in 1586 and served as Sheriff of Caernarvonshire for 1587–88 and 1602–03 and Sheriff of Merionethshire for 1588–89 and 1600–01. He was appointed Deputy Lieutenant of Caernarvonshire in 1587, a member of the Council of the Marches of Wales c.1603 and Custos Rotulorum of Caernarvonshire in 1618 (to 1627).

Wynn was regarded as quarrelsome and a bad neighbour and landlord. His lawsuits often went on for many years; some were against his own relatives like Sir Richard Bulkeley and the Griffiths of Penrhyn Castle. He became regarded as such a public nuisance that in 1615 the Council of the Marches of Wales, of which he was a former member, reprimanded him, fined him and briefly imprisoned him.

In 1606, he was made a knight and in 1611 became the first of the Wynn baronets. He was interested in several mining ventures and also found time for antiquarian studies.

Family
He married Sidney, daughter of Sir William Gerard, Lord Chancellor of Ireland, and his wife Dorothy Barton, by whom he had 10 sons and 2 daughters. His eldest son, John, was unhappily married to Eleanor Cave in 1606 and died in Italy in 1614.

Sir John's successor was his second and eldest surviving son Richard. His daughter Elizabeth married Sir John Bodvel of Caerfryn, and was the mother of John Bodvel. Another daughter, Mary, married Sir Roger Mostyn.

Works

Wynn's work The History of the Gwydir Family, which had a great reputation in North Wales, was intended to assert his claim to royal ancestry. In a legal challenge to this claim, Thomas Prys of Plas Iolyn brought a case against him and Sir John was forced to defend himself in court. He won the case and afterwards was recognised as the most prominent male heir of the House of Gwynedd. Under Welsh succession law the head of the Price of Esgairweddan family at the time, descended through Iorwerth ab Owain Gwynedd and Dafydd II, would lead the senior line and be de jure Princes of Gwynedd, however they died out in the male line in 1702 and the royal title and headship of the House of Aberffraw would have passed then from the Price family to the Wynn Family of Gwydir at that time under the native succession law of Kings laid out in Cyfraith Hywel as descendants of one of the surviving senior lineages of the Welsh Royal Houses.John Wynn's book was first published by Daines Barrington in 1770, and in 1878 an edition was published at Oswestry. It is valuable as the only work which describes the state of society in North Wales in the 15th and the earlier part of the 16th century.

 Owain Gwynedd, Prince of Gwynedd (d. November 1170), married Cristina ferch Gronw ap Owain ap Edwin
 Rhodri ab Owain Gwynedd, Lord of Anglesey (d.1195), married Annest ferch Rhys ap Gruffudd
 Tomas ap Rhodri married Annest ferch Einion ap Seisyllt
 Caradog ap Tomas, married Efa ferch Gwyn ap Gruffudd ap Beli
 Gruffudd ap Caradog, married Lleuca ferch Llywarch Fychan ap Llywarch
 Dafydd ap Gruffudd of Rhos, married Efa ferch Gruffudd Fychan
 Hywel ap Dafydd, married Efa ferch Evan ap Hywel ap Maredudd
 Maredudd ap Hywell (d. after 1353), married Morfydd verch Ieuan ap Dafydd ap Trahaern Goch
 Ifan ap Robert (b. 1438, d. 1469), married Catherine ferch Rhys ap Hywel Fychan
 Maredudd ap Ifan (Ieuan) ap Robert (b. c. 1459, d. 18 March 1525), married Ales ferch William Gruffudd ap Robin
 John "Wynn" ap Maredudd (d. 9 July 1559), married Ellen Lloyd ferch Morys ap John
 Morys Wynn ap John (d.1580), married (1) Jane Bulkeley; (2) Ann Grevill; and (3) Katherine of Berain 
 Sir John Wynn ap Morys of Gwydir, later Sir John Wynn, 1st Baronet

Legacy
At Llanrwst Wynn founded a hospital and endowed a school, now Ysgol Dyffryn Conwy. His estate of Gwydir came to Robert Bertie, first Duke of Ancaster, in the 17th century, by his marriage with the heiress of the Wynns. On the death of the penultimate duke in 1779, Gwydir was inherited by his sister Priscilla, Baronness Willoughby de Eresby in her own right, whose husband was created Baron Gwydyr.

On the death of Alberic, Baron Willoughby de Eresby in 1870, this title (now merged in that of earl of Ancaster) fell into abeyance between his two daughters, while that of Baron Gwydir passed to his cousin and male heir. Gwydir itself was sold by the earl of Ancaster in 1895, the house and part of the estate being bought by Lord Carrington, who also claimed descent from Sir John Wynn.

On 28 May 2010, Llanrwst celebrated the 400th anniversary of the almshouses there, which were built by Sir John Wynn to provide shelter for twelve poor older men of the parish. Today, those twelve rooms are used to show different periods of history.

In this festival, Sir John Wynn was played by actor Sion Rickard, a student studying Performing Arts at Coleg Llandrillo, who arrived with his "wife" in the main square of Llanrwst by horse and carriage from Gwydir Castle, then answered questions from the local town crier, went inside the almshouse to check the standard of what he had built and delivered a speech to the people of Llanrwst.

References

 

Attribution

Further reading

Wynn, John
Wynn, John
Alumni of All Souls College, Oxford
Members of the Inner Temple
Wynn, John
Welsh royalty
Monarchs of Gwynedd
House of Aberffraw
16th-century Welsh writers
16th-century male writers
17th-century Welsh writers
17th-century male writers
Members of the Parliament of England (pre-1707) for constituencies in Wales
English MPs 1586–1587
High Sheriffs of Merionethshire
High Sheriffs of Caernarvonshire
Deputy Lieutenants of Caernarvonshire